Joline is a given name. Notable people with the name include:

Joline Beam, American politician
Joline Blais (born 1960), American writer, educator, and designer
Joline Godfrey (born 1950), American businesswoman
Joline Henry (born 1982), American netball player
Joline Höstman (born 1988), Swedish swimmer